Joseph Paul Oswald Wirth (5 August 1860, Brienz, Canton of Bern – 9 March 1943) was a Swiss occultist, artist and author. He studied esotericism and symbolism with Stanislas de Guaita and in 1889 he created, under the guidance of de Guaita, a cartomantic Tarot consisting only of the twenty-two Major Arcana. Known as "Les 22 Arcanes du Tarot Kabbalistique", it followed the designs of the Tarot de Marseille closely but introduced several alterations, incorporating extant occult symbolism into the cards. The Wirth/de Guaita deck is significant in the history of the tarot for being the first in a long line of occult, cartomantic, and initiatory decks.

His interests also included Freemasonry and Astrology. He wrote many books in French regarding Freemasonry, most importantly a set of three volumes explaining Freemasonry's first three degrees.

Wirth is best known as the author of Le Tarot des imagiers du Moyen Âge (1927), translated and published in English as The Tarot of the Magicians (1985).

On January 28, 1884, Wirth was initiated in the regular Scottish Rite Masonic Lodge La Bienfaisance Châlonnaise affiliated to the Grand Orient of France. In 1889, he joined the Scottish Rite Travail et les Vrais Amis Fidèles where he became Grand Master . In 1898, the latter lodge was admitted to the Grand Lodge of France.

Works
 Le Livre de Thot comprenant les 22 arcanes du Tarot (1889).
 L'Imposition des mains et la médecine philosophale (1897), Paris.
 La Franc-maçonnerie rendue intelligible à ses adeptes, sa philosophie, son objet, sa méthode, ses moyens, three volumes:
 Vol. I: Le livre de l'Apprenti : manuel d'instruction rédigé à l'usage des FF. du 1er degré (1893, 2nd revised edition 1908), Paris.
 Vol. II: Le livre du Compagnon : manuel d'instruction rédigé à l'usage des FF. du 2° degré (1912), Paris.
 Vol. III: Le livre du Maître : manuel d'instruction rédigé à l'usage des FF. du 3° degré (1922), Paris.
 Le Symbolisme hermétique dans ses rapports avec l'alchimie et la franc-maçonnerie (1910), Paris.
 Les Signes du zodiaque, leur symbolisme initiatique (1921), Paris.
 Le Serpent vert (1922) (translation and analysis of Das Märchen by Goethe), Paris.
 L'Idéal initiatique (1924), Paris.
 Le Tarot des imagiers du Moyen Âge (1927), Paris.
 Introduction à l’étude du tarot (1931), Paris.
 Les Mystères de l'art royal - Rituel de l'adepte (1932), Paris.
 Stanislas de Guaïta, souvenirs de son secrétaire (1935), Paris.
 Le Symbolisme astrologique : planètes, signes du zodiaque, maisons de l'horoscope, aspects, étoiles fixes (1938), Paris.
 Qui est régulier ? Le pur maçonnisme sous le Régime des Grandes Loges inauguré en 1717 (1938), Paris.

References

External links

Seminar Interlaken around Oswald Wirth near his birth place June 2014 Switzerland 

1860 births
1943 deaths
People from Interlaken-Oberhasli District
Swiss occult writers
People from Brienz
French Freemasons
Tarot readers
Tarotologists
Astrologers